Martin van Meytens (24 June 1695 – 23 March 1770) was a Swedish-Austrian painter who painted members of the Royal Court of Austria such as Marie Antoinette, Maria Theresa of Austria, Francis I, Holy Roman Emperor, the Emperor's family and members of the local aristocracy. His painting style inspired many other painters to paint in a similar format.

Life and career 

Martin van Meytens was born and baptised in Stockholm, Sweden, son of the painter Martin Meytens the Elder, who had moved around 1677 from The Hague to Sweden. He went early in his career on an extended study trip. He visited London, Paris and Vienna, then he lived and worked for a long time in Italy (Rome, Turin). At the beginning he painted little enamel miniature portraits, and he changed to oil painting only around 1730, having settled in Vienna. Here he became very popular as a portrait painter in the circles of the court and the aristocracy. In 1732 he became a court painter, and in 1759 the director of the Viennese Academy of Fine Arts. Franz Xaver Messerschmidt was his protégé.

Meytens was one of the most significant Austrian painters of representative Baroque courtly portrait, and through his pupils and followers his influence remained alive and widespread for a long time throughout the whole Empire. His personal virtues, varied interests, erudition and pleasant manners were highly appreciated by his contemporaries.

The Wedding Supper  depicts the wedding of Princess Isabella of Parma and Joseph II, Holy Roman Emperor, 5 October 1760, at Hofburg Palace's  Redoutensaele (Redoute Hall). The moment depicted is when the dessert is served, in the middle of the table is a garden made by sugar crust.

Among his pupils was Giovanni Gabriele Cantone (born Vienna, 24 May 1710).

Works 

ca. 1731; Kneeling Nun, Recto, (Nationalmuseum – Stockholm)
1741; Kaiser Franz I
1744; Maria Theresia, (Ghent Town Hall)
1745–1750; Familie der Grafen Pálffy
1750; Archduke Maximilian, (The Winnipeg Art Gallery)
1752–1753; Fam. Grill, (Museum Gothenburg)
1750–1755; Maria Theresia als Herrscherin, (Schönbrunn Palace)
1754; Ksl. Familie, (Schönbrunn Palace);
1759; Maria Theresia, (Academy of Fine Arts)

Selected works

References

Other sources
Biography – Austria Forum
Biography – Web Gallery of Art
Biography and more paintings – ArtExperts.

External links

1695 births
1770 deaths
18th-century Austrian painters
18th-century Austrian male artists
Austrian male painters
18th-century Swedish painters
18th-century Swedish male artists
Swedish male painters
Artists from Stockholm
Austrian people of Dutch descent
Austrian people of Flemish descent
Swedish people of Dutch descent
Swedish people of Belgian descent